Jaco Labuschagne (born 29 April 1999) is a South African rugby union player for the  in the Currie Cup and . His regular position is flanker.

Labuschagne was named in the  squad for the 2021 Currie Cup Premier Division.

References

South African rugby union players
1999 births
Living people
Rugby union flankers
Blue Bulls players
Bulls (rugby union) players
Rugby union players from Mpumalanga
Pumas (Currie Cup) players